The Lincoln Public Library is a Carnegie library located at 725 Pekin St. in Lincoln, Illinois. Built in 1902, the library was funded by a $25,000 grant from the Carnegie Foundation. Chicago architect W. A. Otis designed the library in the Classical Revival style. The building's design features an entrance portico, a raised first floor, a Tuscan cornice, stone decorations, and a red tile roof. The portico includes four Tuscan columns, a pediment with its own cornice, a plinth, and acanthus decorations, and an oak double door with another cornice and an overhead window. The library has been continuously used since its opening.

The library was added to the National Register of Historic Places on September 12, 1980.

References

External links
The library website

Libraries on the National Register of Historic Places in Illinois
Neoclassical architecture in Illinois
Library buildings completed in 1902
Buildings and structures in Logan County, Illinois
Carnegie libraries in Illinois
National Register of Historic Places in Logan County, Illinois